Jackson is the only city and county seat of Jackson County in the U.S. state of Michigan. As of the 2020 census, the city population was 31,309. Jackson is the core city of the Jackson Metropolitan Statistical Area, which includes all of Jackson County and population of 160,248.

Founded in 1829, it was named after President Andrew Jackson.  Michigan's first prison, Michigan State Prison (or Jackson State Prison), opened in Jackson in 1838 and remains in operation. For the longest time, the city was known as the "birthplace of the Republican Party" when politicians met in Jackson in 1854 to argue against the expansion of slavery, although the political party now formally recognizes its birthplace as being Ripon, Wisconsin.  Nevertheless, the Republican Party's earliest history dates back to Jackson and is commemorated by a plaque in the city's Under the Oaks City Park, which has since been visited by numerous Republican presidents.

At the beginning of the twentieth century, Jackson became an early automotive manufacturing center that attracted southerners and immigrants to the city's numerous factories, which saw its population increase significantly.

History

On July 3, 1829, Horace Blackman, accompanied by Alexander Laverty, a land surveyor, and Pewytum, an Indian guide, forded the Grand River and made camp for the night at a site now marked as Trail and N. Jackson Street. They arrived there along a well-traveled Native American trail leading west from Ann Arbor. Blackman had hired Laverty and Pewytum to guide him west.

He returned to the Jackson area in August 1829 with his brother Russell. Together they cleared land and built a cabin at what would become the corner of Ingham and Trail streets. The town was first called Jacksonopolis. Later, it was renamed Jacksonburgh. Finally in 1838, the town's name was changed to simply Jackson.

Birthplace of the Republican Party – "Under the Oaks"

Jackson is one of the birthplaces of the Republican Party. The first official meeting of the group that called itself "Republican" was held in Jackson on July 6, 1854. A Michigan historical marker at what is now the northwest corner of Second and Franklin streets in Jackson commemorates an anti-slavery county convention held that day. Meeting outside to avoid a hot, overcrowded hall, the group ultimately selected a slate of candidates for state elections. The marker identifies this as the birth of the Republican Party. The site, an oak grove on "Morgan's Forty", then on the outskirts of town, became known as "Under the Oaks".

Auto industry
Before Detroit began building cars on assembly lines in 1910, Jackson factories were making parts for cars and putting them together. By 1910, the auto industry had become Jackson's main industry. More than 20 different brands of cars were once made in Jackson, including: Reeves, Jaxon, Jackson, CarterCar, Orlo, Whiting, Butcher and Gage; Buick, Janney, Globe, Steel Swallow, C.V.I., Imperial, Ames-Dean, Cutting, Standard Electric, Duck, Briscoe, Argo, Hollier, Hackett, Marion-Handly, Gem, Earl, Wolverine, and Kaiser-Darrin. 
Ye Ole Carriage Shop in Spring Arbor displays more than 60 antique and classic cars, including five one-and-onlys and 16 made in Jackson. One of these is a 1902 JAXON. Today the auto parts industry remains one of the largest employers of skilled machine operators in Jackson County. The city was also an early site for the moped parts industry.

Birthplace of the Coney Island hot dog
In 1914 Macedonian immigrant George Todoroff founded the first "Coney Island restaurant" and created his famous Coney Island hot dog topping.  His Coney Island restaurant was located directly in front of the railroad station on East Michigan Avenue and was open 24 hours. The restaurant proved to be a popular dining option for rail passengers. Over the course of 31 years, Todoroff sold more than 17 million Coney Island hot dogs. Today two Coney Island restaurants unaffiliated with Todoroff's are located in a building near the train station on East Michigan Avenue, Virginia Coney Island and Jackson Coney Island.  In addition, several area restaurants throughout the Jackson area offer their own version of the Coney Island hot dog, or just "coney" as referred to by local residents. Jackson's version of the coney dog is distinctly different from those featured in Detroit-area Coney Island restaurants or other Coney Island restaurants throughout Michigan and the Midwest. In 2014 Todoroff's Coney Island celebrated its centenary.

Michigan's first state prison (1838–1934) 
The legislature authorized Michigan's first state prison in 1838. A temporary wooden prison, enclosed by a fence of tamarack poles, was built on 60 acres donated for that purpose inside the city limits of Jackson. In 1839 the first 35 prisoners were received. A permanent prison was built three years later. 
Beginning in the 1850s, Warden H.F. Hatch placed more emphasis on the education and rehabilitation of prisoners. By 1882, Michigan's First State Prison (1838–1934) had developed as the largest walled prison in the world.  Within its walls, the factories and surrounding farms, manned by cheap inmate labor, made Jackson one of the leading industrial cities in the nation. In 1934 a new prison was completed just north of Jackson's city limit in Blackman Township; it took all of the state prisoners.

The historic building is now used as an artists' resident community, known as the Armory Arts Village. Tours of the original prison site on Cooper Street are available through the Original Jackson Historic Prison Tours. A closed, fully intact cell block at the modern prison in Blackman Township was operated as the Cell Block 7 Prison Museum from 2014-2019. Independently operated by the accredited Ella Sharp Museum, this was the only museum where visitors could enter a closed cell block on the grounds of an active prison for a self-guided tour.

Corset industry (1860s–1920s)
Numerous railroad connections were constructed to Jackson, connecting it to many markets. The local invention of the duplex corset by Bortree helped make Jackson a center of corset manufacturing. By the early 20th century, as many as 16 manufacturers of women's corsets operated here; the majority of which were located on Cortland and Pearl streets. As elastics were adopted in manufacturing and fashions changed, the corset industry quickly declined. The majority of the corset manufacturers in Jackson closed their doors by 1920. Only three of the original corset companies survived past the 1920s, by changing their production to therapeutic and prosthetic support garments and devices.

"The First"
Moses Bortree founded the Bortree Corset Company, the first corset manufacturer outside of New York, in 1868 at 112 W. Cortland. Founded to make crinoline skirts and bustles (hoop skirts!), they began manufacturing Bortree's newest creation, the Duplex Corset, in 1875. Within five years, production rose from 50,000 to 300,000 corsets per year.

"The Biggest"
Founded in 1884, the Jackson Corset Co. became the largest manufacturer of corset and waist garments in the US. Located at 209-215 W. Cortland St., they employed almost 300 people by 1895.

"Woman-Owned"
The Coronet Corset Manufactory opened in 1880 at 146 W. Main St. and later moved to 131-133 W. Pearl St. Coronet had the distinction of being run by the first and only female president, Mrs. C.A. McGee, who invented and patented the Coronet Corset.

Sources: The History of Business and Industry in Jackson, Michigan by the Ella Sharp Museum, 1993 (available at Jackson District Library) and recent Jackson Citizen Patriot stories (available at http://www.mlive.com/jackson/).

Geography

Economy

Restructuring in heavy industry in the mid-20th century caused a decline in jobs and population in many industrial cities, including Jackson. There are three major private employers in the city. CMS Energy provides natural gas and electrical services to much of Michigan and has its international headquarters in the city. The next two major employers are Henry Ford Health Systems (formerly Foote Hospital) and the Eaton Corporation.

Michigan Automotive Compressor, Inc. (MACI) is the largest manufacturer in Jackson County and its fourth-largest individual employer. In February 2009 it began offering voluntary buyouts to its workers, in reaction to the slowing economy during the financial crisis.

Family-owned food manufacturer and distributor Dawn Foods has been based in Jackson since 1920.

Jackson Flexible Products, just outside the city, has been one of North America's premier custom-molded rubber specialists since 1969. The company employs over 35 people, providing components for the aerospace, automotive and defense industries.

Jackson's state prison complex includes the first state prison building, which was expanded and became known as the largest walled prison in the world. Portions of the prison complex closed in 2007, including the Annex of the Charles Egeler Reception and Guidance Center Annex (RGC) and the Southern Michigan Correctional Facility (JMF). One of the closed cell blocks at JMF has been adapted and re-opened as the Cell Block 7 Prison Museum.

The other facilities in the complex, including two in the old walled building, remain open: the G. Robert Cotton Correctional Facility (JCF), the Cooper Street Correctional Facility (JCS), the Charles Egeler Reception and Guidance Center (RGC), and the Parnall Correctional Facility (SMT).

Government

The city levies an income tax of 1 percent on residents and 0.5 percent on nonresidents.
 Federally, Jackson is located in Michigan's 7th congressional district, represented by Republican Tim Walberg.

Education
Jackson is served by Jackson Public Schools. The Jackson urbanized area is home to approximately 16 elementary public schools, as well as about 16 private or parochial schools.  It also has a large public middle school (The Middle School at Parkside). It has  nine high schools: the public Jackson High School, East Jackson Secondary School (Public), Jackson County Western High School, and Northwest High School, T. A. Wilson Academy, Napoleon High School, and Vandercook Lake High School; and the private DaVinci Institute (Charter), Jackson Preparatory and Early College (Charter), and Jackson Christian School (Non-Denom), and Lumen Christi Catholic School (Catholic).

There is adult and higher education as well: Jackson College (formerly Jackson Community College), Baker College, Career Quest Learning Centers, and Spring Arbor University. An additional 15 higher education institutions are within one hour of Jackson County.

Demographics

2010 census
As of the census of 2010, there were 33,534 people, 13,294 households, and 7,872 families residing in the city. The racial makeup of the city was 71.4% White, 20.4% African American, 0.4% Native American, 0.7% Asian, 1.6% from other races, and 5.5% from two or more races. Hispanic or Latino of any race were 5.3% of the population.

There were 13,294 households, of which 35.8% had children under the age of 18 living with them, 30.7% were married couples living together, 22.4% had a female householder with no husband present, 6.1% had a male householder with no wife present, and 40.8% were non-families. 33.9% of all households were made up of individuals, and 9.7% had someone living alone who was 65 years of age or older. The average household size was 2.46 and the average family size was 3.14.

The median age in the city was 32.2 years. 28.5% of residents were under the age of 18; 10.5% were between the ages of 18 and 24; 27.7% were from 25 to 44; 23.1% were from 45 to 64; and 10.3% were 65 years of age or older. The gender makeup of the city was 47.7% male and 52.3% female.

2000 census
As of the census of 2000, there were 36,316 people, 14,210 households, and 8,668 families residing in the city. The racial makeup of the city was 73.87% White, 19.70% Black or African American, 0.56% Native American, 0.51% Asian, 0.04% Pacific Islander, 1.65% from other races, and 3.67% from two or more races. 4.05% of the population were Hispanic or Latino of any race.

There were 14,210 households, out of which 33.7% had children under the age of 18 living with them, 35.8% were married couples living together, 19.9% had a female householder with no husband present, and 39.0% were non-families. 32.0% of all households were made up of individuals, and 10.8% had someone living alone who was 65 years of age or older.  The average household size was 2.48 and the average family size was 3.12.

In the city, the population was spread out, with 29.7% under the age of 18, 9.8% from 18 to 24, 30.4% from 25 to 44, 18.2% from 45 to 64, and 11.9% who were 65 years of age or older.  The median age was 31 years. For every 100 females, there were 91.0 males.  For every 100 females age 18 and over, there were 85.5 males.

The median income for a household in the city was $31,294, and the median income for a family was $39,072. Males had a median income of $31,957 versus $23,817 for females. The per capita income for the city was $15,230.  About 15.2% of families and 19.6% of the population were below the poverty line, including 26.9% of those under age 18 and 11.0% of those age 65 or over.

Places of worship
Jackson has a number of notable historic churches, several of which were established prior to the American Civil War. The First Baptist Church was established in 1839; the present building, a Romanesque Revival structure, was dedicated in March 1872. The First Congregational Church is housed in a monumental Romanesque Revival building constructed in 1859. A basement was added after the structure had been in operation for several years. In 1871 the building was raised eight feet to accommodate lower-level classrooms.  Its congregation has actively participated in local social reform efforts, becoming part of the antislavery movement in the 1840s and later supporting the temperance and the civil rights movement. St. Paul's Episcopal Church was also founded in 1839. The congregation's first church building, constructed in 1840, was replaced by a Romanesque Revival building in 1853; it is one of the oldest Episcopal Church structures in southern Michigan.

Constructed in 1857, St. John's the Evangelist Church is the oldest Roman Catholic church in the city. It was established as a mission in 1836 to serve a congregation that was originally predominately Irish immigrants. Given the following waves of Catholic immigrants from other countries, its congregation today is more diverse. St. Mary Star of the Sea was established in 1881 as Jackson's second Catholic church. The present building, a limestone Romanesque structure built between 1923 and 1926, incorporates elements of the parish's first church as well as stained glass windows, marble altars and communion rails imported from Italy and Austria. The first and only Eastern Orthodox Church is St. Demetrius Orthodox Church, founded in 1958.  Among the modern churches in the town is Westwinds Community Church, a non-denominational, evangelical Christian church. Founded in 1865 in a blacksmith shop, Community Jackson African Methodist Episcopal Church became the first place of worship for African Americans in Jackson County.
 
Late 19th-century immigrants included Jews from Germany and eastern Europe. Jackson is home to Temple Beth Israel, a Reform synagogue founded in 1862 by German Jewish immigrants.

Transportation
From the late nineteenth century into the mid-twentieth century, Jackson was a major railway hub and for over a century has been known as the crossroads of Michigan.  Today the Michigan Central Railroad Jackson Depot on East Michigan Avenue is the nation's oldest train station in continuous active use. It was listed on the National Register of Historic Places in 2002.

Amtrak, the national passenger rail system, provides service to Jackson, operating its Wolverine three times daily in each direction between Chicago and Pontiac, Michigan, via Detroit. Baggage cannot be checked at this location; however, up to two suitcases, in addition to any "personal items" such as briefcases, purses, laptop bags, and infant equipment, are allowed on board as carry-ons.

Jackson and Lansing Railroad (JAIL) owns a line from Jackson to Lansing, Michigan. Norfolk Southern (NS) owns a yard in Jackson as well.

Major highways
The junction of I-94 and US 127 was built at Jackson.

 is a north–south highway providing access northerly toward Lansing and Clare and southerly into Ohio. It is freeway from Jackson northerly past Lansing, while the freeway south of Jackson quickly transitions to a two-lane, uncontrolled access highway.
 is a loop route running through downtown, connecting with US 127 at either end.
 enters Jackson from the northwest, and exits southeast of town.
 approaches Jackson from the southwest, ending at I-94 west of the city.
 enters Jackson from the northeast and ends downtown.

Airport
Reynolds Field at Jackson County Airport is the main airport for the city. It hosted commercial service, primarily under the North Central Airlines banner, until 1984.  With the "Blue Goose" aircraft now gone, the airport today operates as a general aviation facility. The 700-acre airport, equipped with an ILS system, is located just south of I-94 ( Airport Road exit #137). More than 100 general aviation aircraft are housed here, ranging from single-engine planes to business/corporate jet aircraft.

The Airport is home to many related businesses, including the Jackson College Flight School, a restaurant, bar, and car rental. The Jackson Blues Festival is held here annually in June.

Public transportation
Jackson Area Transportation Authority operates ten routes Monday through Saturday out of a central station located downtown. Greyhound Lines provides service from the JATA station. In addition to the publicly funded JATA, there are four private taxicab companies operating in town.

Parks and recreation 
The City of Jackson Parks and Recreation Department includes:
 1 18-hole golf course
 1 driving range
 1 horseshoe court
 1 miniature golf course
 1 outdoor swimming pool
 2 community recreation centers
 2 outdoor volleyball courts
 3 baseball fields
 7 picnic shelters
 11 soccer fields
 12 outdoor basketball courts
 17 softball fields – 4 lighted, 13 unlighted
 14 fully equipped playground areas
 26 parks, totaling 645 acres
Some of the parks include:
 Blackman Park: a small city park on Michigan Avenue in the middle of the city of Jackson, contains a fountain in the middle of the park honoring soldiers from the Civil War, a few benches and some foliage.
 Bloomfield Park: a small park in the Jackson city limits on Michigan Avenue. There are picnic tables, basketball courts, tennis courts, baseball/softball fields and a small playground.
 Falling Waters Trail: 10.5-mile asphalt rail-trail follows the old rail bed of the former Michigan Central Railroad from Weatherwax Road in Jackson to the village of Concord. The trail has been dedicated as a Jackson County Park. The trail is mostly rural, with only a few road crossings. It also crosses the Lime Lake County Park (5501 Teft Road) where you can drop a line for fish. The trail continues as the Intercity Trail for another 3.4 miles from Weatherwax Road to Morrell Street.
 Sparks Park and The Cascades (AKA Cascade Falls Park): one of the larger parks in the country. The park contains the Cascades Championship Golf Course, one with 18 holes and a short course with 9 hole, as well as two large play structures, basketball court, baseball and softball fields and a popular paved walking path. It is famous for the Cascade Falls, which is one of the largest man-made waterfalls in the world, with 6 immense fountains, 3 reflecting pools and 16 falls. The Cascades Manor House hosts wedding receptions and corporate events. The park is also home to the Cascades Ice Cream Co. which opens when there is usually still snow on the ground and stays open until October. Every late August, the annual Cascades Civil War Muster is held there. There are some man-made ponds and wetlands with many types of water fowl. In 2012, the urban fishery opened, stocked with blue gill and large mouth bass. This pond features informative signs, a large picnic gazebo and a fishing pier, accessible by wheelchair. Part of it is in the city of Jackson, but most is in Summit Township.
 Dahlem Environmental Education Center: is a nature center located in Summit Township in the southern part of the county. It has an educational center, five miles of trails, many ponds, wetlands, and a forest area. A resurfaced 3/8 mile trail has been specially redesigned for visitors with limited mobility. Dahlem is also known to have one of the largest eastern bluebird trails.
 Ella Sharp Park: the largest city park located on 562 acres along the banks of the southwest branch of the Grand River in the city of Jackson. It consists of a golf course, a miniature golf course, a golf learning center, flower gardens, miles of hiking & biking trails, a basketball court, soccer fields, softball fields, the Peter Hurst Planetarium, and the Ella Sharp Museum. The Ella Sharp Park is the host to the annual Jackson Hot Air Jubilee in July.
 Loomis Park: a shady park in the Jackson city limits. It consist of picnic tables, two outdoor basketball courts, two outdoor tennis courts, baseball/softball fields and a large wooden playground. The park also contains the Boos Recreation Center which hosts a variety of classes, events and workshops year-round.
 Martin Luther King Center: a full service community center part of the Howard Charles Woods Recreational Complex, a park in the Jackson city limits. It has picnic tables, a playground, two outdoor basketball courts, a tennis court, two baseball/softball fields and a recreation area with some trees and foliage.
 Nixon Park (William Nixon Memorial park): a water park in the city of Jackson. It has a public pool and water park including two large water slides. It has a skateboard park with ramps, a full-size inline hockey rink as well as four softball fields, playground equipment and a picnic shelter.

Notable people
Claire Allen – architect
Fairuza Balk – actress, musician, and visual artist; lived here until the age of two with her mother, Cathryn Balk
Austin Blair – governor of Michigan during Civil War
Kara Braxton –  WNBA basketball player
Dan Coats – U.S. congressman and senator, representing Indiana, and Director of National Intelligence in the Trump administration.
Tim Crabtree – Major League Baseball pitcher
Philip Campbell Curtis – artist
Tony Dungy – National Football League player and coach, won Super Bowl XLI, 2016 Pro Football Hall of Fame inductee
Paula Faris – television correspondent for ABC News and The View
Idabelle Smith Firestone – songwriter, wife of tire mogul Harvey Samuel Firestone
Louise V. Gustin – ragtime composer, born in Jackson
Raymond Salvatore Harmon – artist
Jack Harris – National Football League player
Dave Hill – professional golfer
Mike Hill – professional golfer
Fred Janke – football player and mayor of Jackson
David Johnson – jurist, lawyer, legislator
James Earl Jones – stage and screen actor; lived here from the age of five with his maternal grandparents
Ruth Ward Kahn – writer
Steven Kampfer – National Hockey League player, Stanley Cup champion 2011 with Boston Bruins
Vivian Kellogg – All-American Girls Professional Baseball League player
Karch Kiraly – Olympic gold medalist and pro volleyball player
Cheslie Kryst – Miss USA 2019 
Mary Torrans Lathrap – poet, preacher, suffragist, social reformer
Rick Lenz – actor
Clarence Love – NFL player, Super Bowl champion with Baltimore Ravens
Alfred Lucking – U.S. congressman
Anna Theresa Berger Lynch – cornetist and trumpeter; lived and died in Jackson
Gene Markey – decorated naval officer, screenwriter; married to Hedy Lamarr and Myrna Loy
Tim McClelland – Major League Baseball umpire
James McDivitt – NASA astronaut
Harry Melling – NASCAR team owner, won two Daytona 500s
Charles W. Misner – physicist, author of Gravitation
 Marcus Norris (born 1974) - basketball player
Tyler Oakley – YouTuber and LGBT activist
 Rasmea Odeh – convicted of immigration fraud, for concealing her arrest, conviction, and imprisonment for fatal terrorist bombing
Jack Paar – television personality, host of Tonight Starring Jack Paar, predecessor of Johnny Carson
Dominic Pangborn – Korean-American artist and graphic designer
U.E. Patrick – IndyCar team owner and three-time Indy 500 champion owner
Alonzo Sargent – locomotive engineer
Potter Stewart – U.S. Supreme Court justice
Wilbur F. Storey – publisher and editor, founder of Jackson Patriot, owned Detroit Free Press
Brian Stuard – professional golfer
Tyler Thomas – former Canadian Football League player and current Indoor Football League player
Brian VanGorder – football coach, defensive coordinator for Auburn, Notre Dame, NFL's Atlanta Falcons
Rick Wise – Major League Baseball pitcher
Alfred Worden – NASA astronaut and one of 24 people to have travelled to the Moon
Wendy Wyland – diver, Olympic bronze medalist

Sister cities
  Varel, Germany
  Carrickfergus, Northern Ireland, United Kingdom

Climate
This climatic region is typified by large seasonal temperature differences, with warm to hot (and often humid) summers and cold (sometimes severely cold) winters.  According to the Köppen climate classification system, Jackson has a humid continental climate, abbreviated "Dfb" on climate maps.

References

External links

 Official City Web Site
 "Lights on Man-Made Cascade Colored Like Rainbow" Popular Mechanics, August 1932

 
Cities in Jackson County, Michigan
County seats in Michigan
Populated places established in 1829
1829 establishments in Michigan Territory